Baron of Wissekerke (or Wissenkercke) was a title created on 31 July 1630 by the Spanish king Philip IV for Philip of Récourt. Philip had acquired the Lordship of Wissekerke by his marriage to Margareth of Steelant, Lady of Wissekerke. The title remained in use until the death of Ivo of Récourt, the 5th Baron, in 1745.

Barons of Wissekerke (1630-1745)
Philip of Récourt (1561-1635) dit of Licques, Knight, Baron of Wissekerke, Lord of Audenthun and La Verre
Servatius of Récourt dit of Licques (1604-1639), Baron of Wissekerke, Lord of Audenthun and Beaufort
Philip of Récourt dit of Licques (b. 1635), Baron of Wissekerke, Lord of Rupelmonde
Philip of Récourt dit of Licques (d. 1682), Count of Rupelmonde, Baron of Wissekerke, Lord of Beerlandt and Diericxlandt
Maximilian Philip Joseph Eugene of Récourt-Lens-Boulogne-Licques (d. 1710), Count of Rupelmonde, Baron of Wissekerke, Lord of Beerlandt and Diericxlandt
Ivo Mary Joseph of Récourt-Lens-Boulogne-Licques (d. 1745), Count of Rupelmonde, Baron of Wissekerke
Eugene of Récourt, dit of Licques
Aurelia of Récourt, dit of Licques
Two more daughters, both nuns in the Hocht Abbey (Lanaken)
Philip of Récourt, dit of Licques, Lord of La Verre
Nicholas of Récourt, dit of Licques, Lord of La Verre (after his brother's death)
Mary-Philippote of Licques
Clare-Theresa of Licques
Margaret of Récourt, dit of Licques, nun in the Priory of Saint Margaret (Ghent)
Isabella of Récourt, dit of Licques, nun in the Priory of Saint Margaret (Ghent)

References

Barons of Belgium